XHEMIT-FM/XEMIT-AM is a combo radio station in Comitán, Chiapas, Mexico. Broadcasting on 107.9 FM and 540 AM, XHEMIT-FM/XEMIT-AM is owned by the Instituto Mexicano de la Radio and broadcasts a music and information format under the name "Radio IMER".

History
XEMIT-AM 540 came on air in 1988, one of three IMER stations that signed on under agreement with the Chiapas state government.

In 1994, the station added a news program, "Línea 54", in response to the confusion generated by the EZLN situation in Chiapas. At the time, the station broadcast with 700 W of power when it was authorized for 5 kW; it reached its maximum authorization with a new antenna and tower in 1995, significantly expanding its coverage.

In 2013, XHEMIT-FM 107.9 was signed on as part of the AM-FM migration campaign currently underway among Mexican radio stations. XHEMIT-FM broadcasts in HD Radio. XEMIT-AM has one of Mexico's largest continuity obligations requiring it to remain in service, for a total of nearly 120,000 otherwise unserved people in 680 unique localities as of 2018.

External links

References

Radio stations in Chiapas
Radio stations established in 1988
Radio stations in Mexico with continuity obligations